The Municipality of Centro is one of the 17 subdivisions of the Mexican state of Tabasco. Its municipal seat is located in the city of Villahermosa. The municipality had a 2010 census population of 640,359 inhabitants, 353,577 (55.2%) of whom lived in its municipal seat, Villahermosa.

The municipal government is headed by the municipal president (mayor) of Centro.

Towns and villages
The municipality has the distinction of having 72 towns (localities) of over 1,000 inhabitants, and 116 towns of over 500 inhabitants, in both cases more than any other municipality in Mexico. The largest localities (cities, towns, and villages) are:

See also
 List of municipal presidents of Centro Municipality, Tabasco

References

Municipalities of Tabasco